Shubh Shagun was an Indian drama series produced by Smita Thackeray, Swati Thanawala and Kundan Singh; launched under Rahul Media And Production LLP, broadcast on  Dangal. It premiered on 2 May 2022 and ended on 29 October 2022 and starred Krishna Mukherjee and Shehzada Dhami.

Plot 
Shubh Jaiswal is an arrogant businessman in Mumbai. He has a younger sister named Navya Jaiswal. He lives with his aunts Kanika and Bindiya Jaiswal along with their husbands and younger sister Navya. Another character named Shagun Shinde, who is a devotee of Lord Ganesha lives with her family. She is the elder sister of Yug Shinde and works at Shubh's company. 

Things get wrong, when Yug falls in love with Navya, but Shagun dislikes her due to misunderstandings while Shubh tries to get Yug married to Navya and make him home-husband as he cannot deny his sister's wish. After many misunderstandings later Yug marries Navya and Shagun and her family members likes their marriage. Shubh later learns about it and kidnaps Shagun into the godown and tries to burn her. But she narrowly escapes. And later Shubh later knows about this and he brings Yug and Shinde and Shagun into their house by pretending as a good brother. But later Shubh locks Shagun into a room and tries to kill her by bursting the air conditioner. But this fails. Meanwhile, his Daadi later learns of this and she wants to marry Shagun forcefully which shocks Shubh but delights Shagun and he also warns her. At the preparation begins Shubh and Navya replaces a groom and she marries to Shubh unknowingly.

Shagun is surprised to learn this but his aunt and his uncle also dislike Shagun and some family members also support her. But Navya, creates many problems inside them and also she tries to separate Shubh and Shagun but fails. Kanika's husband Brijesh Jaiswal tries to kill Shubh but Shubh was saved by Shagun. Meanwhile, Shubh knows his real Mistake and he knows that he truly loves her and he falls in love with Shagun. Naina, Shubh's mentally challenged first wife enters the house and creates many problems inside the family. She also tries to separate Shubh from Shagun but fails, And she also helps Navya and tries to kill Shagun but fails. Later, Shubh knows her sister's evil plans and slaps her and blames her for trying to separate her from Shubh. Later, Shagun realises her husband's sister's evil games, blames herself and tries to kill herself by jumping off the building.

Cast

Main 
 Krishna Mukherjee as Shagun Jaiswal (née Shinde); Yug's sister and Shubh's wife (2022)
 Shehzada Dhami as Shubh Jaiswal; Navya's cousin brother; Shagun's husband (2022)

Recurring 
 Muohit Joushi as Yug Shinde; Shagun's younger brother and Navya's lover turned ex-husband; Mahi's boyfriend (2022)
 Kajol Srivastav as Navya Jaiswal / Navya Yug Shinde; Shubh's cousin sister and Yug's lover turned ex-wife (2022)
 Vivana Singh as Bindiya Viraj Jaiswal; Shubh's aunt; Viraj's wife and Shagun's bua (2022)
 Papiya Sengupta as Kanika Jaiswal; Navya's mother (2022)
 Vandana Vithlani as Archana Shinde (2022)
 Chetan Hansraj as Brijesh Jaiswal; Kanika's husband and Navya's father (2022)
 Jaydeep Singh as Viraj Jaiswal; Bindiya's husband (2022)
 Smita Dongre as Radha Shinde (2022)
 Anuradha Kanabar as Mrs. Jaiswal: Shubh and Navya's grandmother; Jaydeep and Kanika's mother (2022)
 Ishita Ganguly as Naina Jaiswal: Shubh's first wife (2022)
 Mehul Kajaria as Dr. Ajay Khuran : Naina's doctor and partner in crime (2022)
 Khushwant Walia as Akash (2022)
 Syed Zafar Ali as Shekhar: Shubh's uncle; Kajal's husband (2022)
 Preeti Singhania as Mahi Jaiswal, Bindiya and Viraj's daughter; Shubh's cousin sister; Yug's girlfriend (2022)
 Srushti Tare as Kajal: Shekhar's wife; Shubh's one-sided lover (2022)

Timing
Shubh Shagun was launched on 2 May 2022 at 7:30 P.M. It went a timeslot change from 25 July 2022, due to the launch of Bindiya Sarkaar at 7:30 P.M. so Shubh Shagun got a new timeslot at 7:00 P.M. Again, it went a timeslot change from 23 August 2022, due to the launch of Jai Hanuman - Sankatmochan Naam Tiharo at 7:00 P.M. so Shubh Shagun got a new timeslot at 6:30 P.M.

References

2022 Indian television series debuts
Indian drama television series
Hindi-language television shows
Indian television series
Indian television soap operas
Serial drama television series
Television shows set in Mumbai
Dangal TV original programming